Alan Bloomfield (born 12 February 1950) is a former Australian rules footballer who played with North Melbourne in the Victorian Football League (VFL). Bloomfield played as a utility.  He was recruited from Ainslie Football Club in the Australian Capital Territory.

Sources

 Holmesby, Russell & Main, Jim (2007). The Encyclopedia of AFL Footballers. 7th ed. Melbourne: Bas Publishing.

External links

1950 births
Australian rules footballers from the Australian Capital Territory
North Melbourne Football Club players
Ainslie Football Club players
Living people
Indigenous Australian players of Australian rules football